William T. Bachman (January 9, 1908 – May 12, 1993) was a Democratic member of the Pennsylvania House of Representatives.

References

Democratic Party members of the Pennsylvania House of Representatives
1908 births
1993 deaths
20th-century American politicians